Wicklow Gap is one of the highest Irish mountain passes served by an asphalted road. It is located in County Wicklow, Ireland.

Geography 
The  pass is opened between Tonelagee (Nort east) and Turlough Hill / Camaderry (South). It connects Dunlavin (West) and Glendalough, and with Sally Gap is one of the two road passes crossing  the Wicklow Mountains. On clear days it is possible to look from the pass across the Irish Sea and see the mountains of Snowdonia (Wales).

Access to the pass 

The scenic R756 road leads to the pass. The road is a popular bicycle ascent; it is considered a category 3 climb by the Tour de France. There is a short road leading from the pass to Turlough Hill, where there is a hydroelectric plant.

Hiking 
The pass is located on Saint Kevin's Way, a long distance waymarked walking trail, on its way from Hollywood to Glendalough.

It is possible to reach both Turlough Hill and Tonelagee by foot from the pass.

See also

 List of mountain passes

Notes

External links

 The Wicklow Gap on visitwicklow.ie

Mountain passes of Ireland
County Wicklow